Kyōto 2nd district (京都府第2区 Kyōto-fu dai-ni-ku or simply 京都2区 Kyōto niku) is a constituency of the House of Representatives in the Diet of Japan. It is located in central Kyoto and consists of the Kyoto city wards of Sakyō, Higashiyama and Yamashina. As of 2012, 267,926 eligible voters were registered in the district.

Before the electoral reform of 1994, the area formed part of Kyoto 1st district where five Representatives had been elected by single non-transferable vote (SNTV).

Kyoto had been a traditional stronghold of the Japanese Communist Party (JCP); but following the electoral reform that replaced the SNTV multi-member districts with FPTP single-member districts, the JCP could only win the new Kyoto 3rd district while losing the other three districts in Kyoto city (Kyoto 1, 2 and 4) in the 1996 general election, the first under the new system. In the 2nd district JCP newcomer Satoshi Inoue lost narrowly to Liberal Democrat Mikio Okuda who had previously represented the old multi-member 1st district. Democrat Seiji Maehara ranked third, but won a seat via the Kinki PR block. After the main opposition New Frontier Party had dissolved and its successor groups had mainly been absorbed by the Democratic Party, Maehara won Kyoto 2 in the 2000 general election and has held onto the seat since. Maehara went on to become Democratic Party president in 2005, but resigned following the Livedoor scandal in 2006 and later was a minister of state in the Democratic-led Hatoyama and Kan cabinets.

Areas Covered

Current District 
As of 5 January 2023, the areas covered by this district are as follows:

 Kyoto
 Sakyō-ku
 Higashiyama-ku
 Yamashina-ku

List of representatives

Election results

References 

Politics of Kyoto Prefecture
Districts of the House of Representatives (Japan)